Prophantis smaragdina is a species of moth of the family Crambidae described by Arthur Gardiner Butler in 1875. It is found in subtropical Africa south of the Sahara.

Food plants
The larvae of this species infest coffee beans. Known food plants of this species are: Rubiaceae (Coffea arabica, Ixora coccinea and Gardenia sp.), Verbenaceae (Duranta plumieri), and Menispermaceae (Triclisia sp.).

References

Bibliography
 Butler, A. G. 1875. "On a collection of Lepidoptera from southern Africa, with descriptions of new genera and species". Annals and Magazine of Natural History. (4)16(96):394–420.

Moths described in 1875
Spilomelinae
Moths of Sub-Saharan Africa
Moths of Madagascar
Moths of Mauritius
Moths of Réunion
Moths of São Tomé and Príncipe
Moths of the Middle East